Paxillus pentataphylloides is a species of beetle in the family Passalidae.

Passalidae
Beetles described in 1931